Let the Old Dreams Die is a short story collection by Swedish writer John Ajvide Lindqvist. The bulk of the stories were originally published in Sweden in 2005 under the title Pappersväggar (Paper Walls). Quercus published the first English-language release in 2011, with the addition of the title story "Let the Old Dreams Die".

The title story is a sequel to Lindqvist's novel Let the Right One In. Also included is "The Final Processing", a sequel to Lindqvist's Handling the Undead. In 2018 the story "Border" was adapted into a feature film.

Contents
 "Border"
 "A Village in the Sky"
 "Equinox"
 "Itsy Bitsy"
 "The Substitute"
 "Eternal/Love"
 "To Put My Arms Around You, to Music"
 "Majken"
 "Paper Walls"
 "Final Processing"
 "Tindalos" (included only in the US edition)
 "Let the Old Dreams Die" (included in the UK and US editions, published separately in Sweden)

Reception
Terrence Rafferty of The New York Times wrote:

References

2005 short story collections
2011 short story collections
Swedish short story collections
Horror short story collections